Tom Clemens (born 30 January 1976) is a British biathlete. He competed in the men's 20 km individual event at the 2006 Winter Olympics.

References

External links
 

1976 births
Living people
British male biathletes
Olympic biathletes of Great Britain
Biathletes at the 2006 Winter Olympics
People from Epping